Oxazolone is a chemical compound and functional group, with the molecular formula C3H3NO2. It was named in-line with the Hantzsch–Widman nomenclature and is part of a large family of oxazole based compounds. There are a total of 5 structural isomers of oxazolone; 3 according to the location of the carbonyl group and 2 more according to the location of the double bound C=X (with X= N or C):
2-(3H)oxazolone
2-(5H)oxazolone
4-(5H)-oxazolone
5-(2H)-oxazolone
5-(4H)-oxazolone

The 4-oxazolone motif, which is also formally a lactam, is present in a number of drugs (fenozolone, thozalinone, cyclazodone, reclazepam etc.).

Substituted 5-oxazolones may also be regarded as the cyclization products of N-acyl α-amino acids, making them lactones, and are sometimes referred to as azlactones.

See also
 Münchnone
 Oxazole
 Oxazolidone — the saturated analogues

References

Oxazolones